Marinino is a rural locality (a selo) in Novoselskoye Rural Settlement, Kovrovsky District, Vladimir Oblast, Russia. The population was 60 as of 2010.

Geography 
Marinino is located 31 km south of Kovrov (the district's administrative centre) by road. Demino is the nearest rural locality.

References 

Rural localities in Kovrovsky District